The 2020 African Nations Championship was an international football tournament held in Cameroon from 16 January to 7 February 2021. The 16 national teams involved in the tournament were required to register a squad of up to 33 players, including at least three goalkeepers, an increase over the usual number of 23 players allowed. Only players in these squads were eligible to take part in the tournament. Unlike the Africa Cup of Nations, this tournament exclusively requires players to be registered to a club within their country to be eligible. Expatriate players, even if they play in Africa, cannot participate in the event.

Due to the COVID-19 pandemic in Africa, the Confederation of African Football (CAF) allowed the 16 teams involved to register a list of up to 33 players (23-man normal squad and up to 10 extra players) in order that teams have available players in case players from their list of 23 with positive tests for SARS-CoV-2 are detected and require to be replaced during the tournament. However, the inclusion of the 10 extra players was optional and not mandatory. Each national team had to submit its list of 23 players and up to 10 optional extra players to CAF Secretary General until 6 January 2021 deadline, 10 days before the start of the tournament.

The age listed for each player is on 16 January 2021, the first day of the tournament. A flag is included for coaches who are of a different nationality than their own national team. Players in cursive were registered as reserves.

Group A

Cameroon
Manager: Martin Ndtoungou

The 23-man squad and 10 reserves were announced on 11 January 2021. Forward Christian Mayo was ruled out due to injury and replaced by Hans Moussima.

Mali
Manager: Nouhoum Diané

The 33-man squad was announced on 8 January 2021.

Burkina Faso
Manager: Seydou Zerbo

The 33-man squad was announced on 3 January 2021.

Zimbabwe
Manager:  Zdravko Logarušić

The 23-man squad and 10 reserves were announced on 4 January 2021. The ten reserves players registered were: defenders Frank Makarati, Tymon Mvula and Munyaradzi Diro-Nyenye; midfielders Devon Chafa, Jeansmith Mutudza, Phineas Bamusi, Ishmael Wadi, Nqobizitha Masuku, Tichaona Chipunza and the forward Thomas Chideu. On 13 January 2021, the reserve Thomas Chideu replaced forward Tawanda Nyamandwe who tested positive for COVID-19. Zimbabwe's squad consisted of only 23 players, the reserve players did not travel to Cameroon.

Group B

Libya
Manager:  Zoran Filipović

DR Congo
Manager: Florent Ibengé

The 33-man squad was announced on 6 January 2021. On 7 January 2021, defender Arsène Zola and midfielder Mokonzi Gbazeke were replaced by Doxa Gikanji and Kadima Kabangu respectively due to administrative reasons.

Congo
Manager: Barthélémy Ngatsono

The 30-man squad was announced by CAF on 16 January 2021. Congo's squad that traveled to Cameroon consisted of 25 players and was announced on 31 December 2020. Reserve forward Judea Mouandzibi was called up to join the 25-man squad on 23 January 2021.

Niger
Manager: Harouna Doula Gabde

The 33-man squad was announced by CAF on 16 January 2021. Niger's squad in Cameroon consisted of 29 players and was announced on 16 January 2021.

Group C

Morocco
Manager: Hussein Ammouta

The 33-man squad was announced on 14 January 2021.

Rwanda
Manager: Vincent Mashami

The 30-man squad was announced on 8 January 2021.

Uganda
Manager:  Johnathan McKinstry

The 25-man squad was announced on 7 January 2021.

Togo
Manager: Jean-Paul Abalo

The 26-man squad was announced on 14 January 2021.

Group D

Zambia
Manager:  Milutin Sredojević

The 31-man squad was announced on 29 December 2020. Midfielder Felix Bulaya and forward Roger Kola were ruled out due to administrative reasons. On 7 January 2021, goalkeeper Allan Chibwe and defender Fackson Kapumbu were summoned to join the squad. Forward Jonathan Munalula was also registered in the squad. Eventually, on 15 January 2021, Zambia's squad was reduced to 28 players by the manager Milutin Sredojević, with defender Fackson Kapumbu, goalkeeper Richard Nyirenda and midfielder Chaniza Zulu being dropped.

Guinea
Manager: Lappé Bangoura

The 30-man squad was announced on 4 January 2021.

Namibia
Manager: Bobby Samaria

The 31-man squad was announced on 14 December 2020. Defender Larry Horaeb was replaced by Charles Hambira. Namibia's squad that traveled to Cameroon consisted of 28 players and was announced on 14 January 2021.

Tanzania
Manager:  Etienne Ndayiragije

The 28-man squad was announced on 14 January 2021.

References

Squads
African Nations Championship squads